Morocco competed at the 2015 World Championships in Athletics in Beijing, China, from 22–30 August 2015.

Medalists
The following Moroccan competitors won medals at the Championships

Results
(q – qualified, NM – no mark, SB – season best)

Men
Track and road events

Women 
Track and road events

Sources 
Moroccan team

Nations at the 2015 World Championships in Athletics
World Championships in Athletics
Morocco at the World Championships in Athletics